Plattenville is an unincorporated community in Assumption Parish, Louisiana, United States. The population was 1,965 at the 2000 census.

References

External links
 Official Plattenville.com website

Unincorporated communities in Assumption Parish, Louisiana
Unincorporated communities in Louisiana
Louisiana Isleño communities